Dario Nardella (born 20 November 1975) is an Italian politician who has been the Mayor of Florence since 26 May 2014 and the first Metropolitan Mayor of Florence since 1 January 2015.

On 1 February 2020, Nardella encouraged Italians to "hug a Chinese" to combat what he described as "psychological terrorism" in the wake of the COVID-19 pandemic.

References 

Living people
Mayors of Florence
Democratic Party (Italy) politicians
21st-century Italian politicians
1975 births